A. spectabilis may refer to:

Abies spectabilis, a conifer species
Acacia spectabilis, a shrub species
Acanthocinus spectabilis, a longhorn beetle species
Acantopsis spectabilis, a fish species
Aechmea spectabilis, a flowering plant species
Aglaia spectabilis, a tree species
Amsinckia spectabilis, a flowering plant species
Anthophrys spectabilis, a moth species
Apalochlamys spectabilis, a flowering plant species
Aspilapteryx spectabilis, a moth species

Synonyms
Agrotis spectabilis, a synonym of Tiracola plagiata, a moth species